Royal Dansk (meaning "Royal Danish") is a Danish brand of butter cookies, manufactured by Kelsen Group A/S. It is known for its distinctive royal blue round tin container. Since 2019, the brand is owned by Italian conglomerate Ferrero SpA, after it acquired the Kelsen Company for $300 million.

Overview 
The "Royal Dansk Company" was started in 1966 in Helsingør, Denmark. In 1990 it merged with another biscuit company, Kjeldsen, whose butter cookies are particularly well known in Hong Kong and China. The merger formed the company Kelsen. Kelsen was acquired by Campbell in 2013, and then sold to Italian manufacturer Ferrero in 2019 for $300 million.

The blue tin box features an image of the Hjemstavnsgaard farmhouse on the island of Funen in Denmark. The container has become a part of popular culture, with many people having kept the tin box and used it for storing other items, most commonly sewing supplies.

References

External links 
 

Brand name cookies
Danish cakes
Danish companies established in 1966
Food brands of Denmark
Ferrero SpA brands